Jay Abdo (born Jihad Abdo or Jihad Abdou; October 21, 1962) is a Syrian actor. He has been acting since 1988, and most recently starred in Queen of the Desert and A Hologram for the King.

Early life 
Abdo was born in Damascus. He traveled to Cluj-Napoca, Romania, to study civil engineering and began acting there. After his success on the stage, he returned to Damascus to study acting at the Higher Institute for Dramatic Arts. After graduating in 1991, he became well known in the Arab world and starred in many films and television shows.

Move to America 
In 2011, during a trip to Beirut where he spoke to a reporter from the Los Angeles Times, Abdo spoke out against the Assad government and how they were "responsible for killings within their borders". After returning to Syria, Abdo received a number of threats and was generally intimidated, and was criticized for his lack of patriotism. Following this, he moved to the United States in October 2011 to escape persecution. He joined his wife in Minnesota, where she was studying as a Humphrey fellow at the Fulbright Program. The couple later moved to Los Angeles so he could start acting again. After working several odd jobs, including delivering for Domino's Pizza, he landed several major roles, including Queen of the Desert and A Hologram for the King.

In 2015, the USC School of Cinematic Arts created a documentary about him titled “Jihad in Hollywood“.

Filmography
2018 - 1st Born
2017 - Facing Mecca
2016 - Bon Voyage
2016 - A Hologram for the King
 2015–2018 - Patriot
2014 - Queen of the Desert
 2014 - Documenters (Short) (completed) — Soldier
 2013 - Father's Revenge (Short) — Father
 2013 - We've Got Balls — Butler
 2012 - Farouk Omar (TV Series) — The Emporio Messenger
 2011 - The Adventures of Delilah and Al Zeibaq (TV Series) — Al Sukary
 2010 - Baed Al Sokoot (TV Movie) — Najy (as Jihad Abdou)
 2008–2010 - Bab Al-Hara (TV Series) — Riyad
 2010 - Sabaya (TV Series) — Osama
 2008 - Zahret Al Nerjis (TV Series) — Raeed
 2006 - Valley of the Wolves: Iraq — Kurdish leader (as Jihad Abdou)
 2001 - Salah al-Din

References

External links

 https://www.latimes.com/opinion/story/2022-10-05/jay-jihad-abdo-refugee-actor-syriaist

1962 births
Living people
People from Damascus
Syrian male film actors
Syrian Muslims
Syrian male television actors
Syrian dissidents
Damascus University alumni
Syrian emigrants to the United States
Syrian exiles